Tang Yuting (born 26 April 1999 in Conghua, Guangzhou)  is a Chinese swimmer. At the 2015 World Championships in Kazan, Russia, Tang'group of four people took the 7th in the 4 × 100 m freestyle event at 3:37.64 in the final, 54.45 seconds by herself, thus qualifying her for the 2016 Summer Olympics in Rio de Janeiro.

References

External links 
 

1999 births
Living people
Chinese female freestyle swimmers
Swimmers from Guangzhou
20th-century Chinese women
21st-century Chinese women